This is a list of heads of state of the Maldives.

Solar and Lunar dynasties

Solar dynasty (Aadheettha Vansa) 
At first, Maldives was a matriarchal society with each atoll ruled by a chief queen according to some accounts or by others, several theocratic societies ruled by priests known as Sawamias of heliolatric, selenolatric and astrolatric religions. After that, the first kingdom was established, named Dheeva Maari.

Lunar dynasty (Soma Vansa) 
Although the first kings of Maldives were of Solar dynasty, the last queen of the solar dynasty, Queen Srimati Damahara married a prince from Lunar dynasty (Soma Vansa) who came from Kalinga thus establishing the line of Soma Vansa.

Theemuge dynasty

Sultan 

  Queen Damahaar Maha Rehendi ( Last Queen of Solar dynasty )
  Svasti Sri Loka Abaruna, King Loka Abaruna
  King Maha Sandura
  Princess Kamanhaar
  Svasti Sri Buwana Ananda, King Buwana ananda
  Svasti Sri Somavamsa Adipati Sri Theemuge Sri Maha Parama Aditya, King Koimala.
 Princess Henevi Ma'ava'a Kilage.
  Prince Dhovemi Kalaminja, Sultan Dhovemi, Dharumavantha Rasgefaanu
 Prince Sri Kalo
 Princess Mulee Mava'a Kilege
  Prince Muthey Kalaminja, Sultan Muthey
 Princess Reki Hiriya Mava'a Kilage
  Prince Ali Kalaminja, Sultan Ali I
 Princess Fahi Hiriya Mava'a Kilage
  Prince Dinei Kalaminja, Sultan Dhinei
  Prince Dihai Kalaminja, Sultan Dhihei
  Prince Valla Dio Kalaminja, Sultan Valla Dio
 Princess Aidigu Mava'a Kilage
  Prince Wadi Kalaminja, Sultan Wadi
  Prince Hali Kalaminja, Sultan Hali I
  Prince Keimi Kalaminja, Sultan Keimi
  Prince Audha, Sultan Audha
  Prince Hali, Sultan Hali II
  Prince Yoosuf, Sultan Yoosuf I
  Prince Davud, Sultan Davud
  Prince Salis, Sultan Salis
  Prince Omar, Sultan Omar I
  Prince Ahmed Shihabuddine, Sultan Ahmed Shihabuddine
  Princess Khadijah, Sultana Rehendi Khadijah
  Princess Raadhafathi, Sultana Raadhafathi
  Princess Dhaain, Sultana Dhaain

Hilaalee dynasty

Sultan 

 Abbas al-Hilal
 Hassan Kuja Malim Kologe
 Yusuf Handegiri Khadim Ma'abanderi
  Sultan Danna Muhammadh
 Princess Tukkabafaanu
 Kulhiveru Hilalu Kaivulanna Kaloge + Golavehi Kabulo
  Hassan I, Sultan Hassan al-Hilali Sri Dhiru Buwana Maha Radhun
  Prince Ibrahim al-Hilali Kalaminja, Sultan Ibrahim I al-Hilali
  Prince Usman Ras Kilege, Sultan Usman II ibnu
  Prince Abu Bakar Kalaminja, Sultan Abu Bakar I
 Princess Rekka
 Dorimena Kilegefaanu
  Al-Amir Dombula Ali Farina Kilege, Sultan Ali V
  Buraki Rani ( Queen regent or Rani ruled with Sultan Kalu Muhammedh )
 Reki
 Princess Kaba Dio
  Shaikh Hassan, Sultan Hassan VI
  Hussain I, Sultan Husain al-Hilali, Sultan of the Maldives ( Twins with brother Hassan )
 Ma'afai Kalo Kilege
 Kaulanna'a Kalo Kilege
  Ali Heneve Ras Kilege, Sultan Ali IV
  Prince Yusuf Kalaminja, Sultan Yusuf II
  Sultan Haji Nasir ul-Mukhatib Hassan III
  Prince Umaru Kalaminja, Sultan Umar II
  Sultan Yusuf III
  Sultan Hassan VII
  Prince Hassan Kalaminnja, Sultan Hassan V
  Prince Ibrahim Kalaminja Ras Kilege, Sultan Ibrahim II
  Prince Yusufu Kalaminja Ras Kilege, Sultan Yusuf III
  Sultan Hassan VII 
  Prince Kalu Muhammad Kalaminja, Sultan Kalu Muhammad
  Prince Hassan Dobula Fa'aruna'a, Sultan Hassan VIII
  Prince Umar Ma'afai Kilege, Sultan Hilali Muhammad
  Sultan Muhammad
 Prince Hemanin Kalaminja
 Prince Ahmad Manikufa'anu Kalaminja
  Sultan Hilali Hassan IX ( Later Dom Manoel )
 Dom Francisco de Malvidas
  Dom João de Malvidas, King Dom Felipe
  Dom Felipe de Malvidas, King Dom Felipe
 Infanta Dona Inez de Malvidas
  Dom Luís de Souza, King Dom Luís
 Manuel de Sousa da Silva
 Dom Manoel Malavis
 Dom Pedro de Malvidas
 Dona Leonor de Malvidas
 Dona Catarina de Malvidas
  Princess Aisha Kabafaanu Rani Kilege + Sultan Ali IV
 Kuda Kalafaanu
 Sitti Maryam Ma'ava'a Kuda Kamanafa'anu Rani Kilege (d/o Aisha Kabafa'anu). m. at Malé, 1573, Al-Amir Hassan Rannabanderi Kilegefa'anu, younger son of Kalege Husain Thakuru'fa'anu, Khatib of Uthimu Island, Tiladummati Atoll
 Kalege Kalu Hassan, of Bararu, Tiladummati Atoll ( Start of The Uthimu Dynasty )
 Kalege Kalu 'Ali Thakurufa'anu, Khatib of Uthimu Island, Tiladummati Atoll
 Kalege Husain Thakuru'fa'anu, Khatib of Uthimu + Amina Dio
 Kalege 'Ali Thakurufa'anu
 Amira Maryam Kamba'adi Kilege
 Amira Amina Ma'ava Kilege + Al-Amir 'Umar Ma'afai Kilege
  Kalu Thukkala, Sultan Shuja'at Muhammad Imad ud-din I, Bodu Rasgefaanu
  Sultan Ibrahim Iskandar I
  Prince Kuda Muhammad, who succeeded as Sultan Muhammad I
 Maryam + the son of Thakandhu 'Ali Bandeyri Thakurufa'anu.
 Princess Rendi Kaba'afa'anu
 A son, unknown name
 Amira Amina Kamba'adi Kilege +  Al-Amir Mahmud Fandiyaru Kilegefa'anu (d. 8 March 1678), Chief Judge 1663-1678, son of Don Boi Naib Thakurufa'anu, the step-son of Addu Bodu Fandiyaru Thakurufa'anu.
 Funadhu Muhammad Siraj ud-din Thakurufa'anu, Khatib.
 Princess "Fulana" + Al-Amir Hassan Farina Kilege Dorimena, younger son of Al-Amir Husain Fa'amuladeri Kilegefa'anu
 Princess Mariyam Kaba'adi Kilege
  Kalege Muhammed Bodu Thakurufa'anu Khatib, who succeeded as Sultan Ghazi Muhammed Thakurufa'anu al-'Azam
  Al-Amir Hassan Thakurufa'anu Khatib + Princess Aisha Kabafa'anu, daughter of Sultan Kalu Muhammad
 Kuda Kalafa'anu
 Al-Amira Kuda Kalu Kamanafa'anu
 Eduru Thakurufa'anu, Khatib of Bararu, Tiladummati Atoll
 Al-Amir 'Umar Oligina Kilege, of Maduvari Island
 Al-Amir Husain Fa'amuladeri Kilegefa'anu
 Al-Amir Muhammd Dorimena Kilegefa'anu
 Al-Amir Hassan Farina Kilege Dorimena
  Muhammad Manikufa'anu, Sultan Muhammad Muhi ud-din

Utheemu dynasty

Sultan

Hamavi dynasty

Sultan

Dhevvadhoo dynasty

Sultan

Isdhoo dynasty

Sultan

Dhiyamigili dynasty

Sultan

Huraa dynasty

Sultan

Dhiyamigili dynasty (restored)

Sultan

Huraa dynasty (first restoration)

Sultan

First Republic of Maldives

President
Political parties

Huraa dynasty (second restoration)

Sultan

Second Republic of Maldives

President
Political parties

See also
History of the Maldives
List of Maldivian monarchs
President of the Maldives

Notes 

 Regnal names are in ancient Maldive language. The names are followed with "Maha Radun" for Kings are "Maha Rehendi" for Queens.
 Sometimes there were no coronation ceremony and for those they were called "Keerithi Maha Radun" for Kings and "Keerithi Maha Rehendi" for Queens.

References

Official website of the Maldives Royal Family
Allama Ahmed Shihabuddine (original work in Arabic, translated to Dhivehi by Dhoondeyri Don Maniku), Kitab fi Athaari Meedoo el-Qadimiyyeh. Male'

 
Maldives
Heads of state